National Secondary Route 212, or just Route 212 (or ) is a National Road Route of Costa Rica, located in the San José province.

Description
In San José province the route covers Desamparados canton (San Antonio, Patarrá, Damas districts).

References

Highways in Costa Rica